Dos Rios (Spanish for "Two Rivers") is an unincorporated community in Mendocino County, California. Dos Rios's ZIP code, 95429, has a population of 70. The Dos Rios AVA is located in the area.

The Two Rivers post office opened in 1912 and changed its name to Dos Rios in 1915. The name comes from the place's proximity to the confluence of the Middle Fork of the Eel River with the Eel River proper. Dos Rios was served by Northwestern Pacific Railroad passenger service until 1971.

Climate
This region experiences very hot and dry summers, with highs recently near  in midsummer.  According to the Köppen Climate Classification system, Dos Rios has a warm-summer Mediterranean climate, abbreviated Csb on climate maps.

References

Unincorporated communities in California
Unincorporated communities in Mendocino County, California